Alexandria is a home rule-class city in Campbell County, Kentucky, in the United States. Along with Newport, it is one of the dual seats of the county. The population was 10,341 at the 2020 census.

History
It is believed that the area that is now Alexandria was first settled by Frank Spilman and his family . The Spilman family was from King George County, Virginia, and they may have named their settlement after Alexandria, Virginia. The family had begun developing and selling lots in the settlement by 1819, the year the first post office was established. On February 22, 1834, Alexandria was formally established by an act of the state assembly.

When the Kentucky General Assembly formed Kenton County from part of Campbell County in 1840, they moved Campbell's county seat from Newport to Alexandria, which was closer to the center of the redrawn county. The citizens of Alexandria quickly constructed a county courthouse but, because the majority of the county's population lived in Newport, the move was not a popular one and it took a court order and a visit from the sheriff to get the county clerk to move.

The city of Alexandria was formally incorporated by act of the state assembly in 1856.

In 1883, Newport successfully lobbied for its own Court House District, allowing it to retain a Court House Commission with taxing authority and various county offices in addition to those maintained at Alexandria. A new courthouse was established in Newport in 1884, and the county's fiscal court and judicial offices operated out of this while other administrative offices remained in Alexandria. Nonetheless, the county was not dual seated until 2010.

Pro wrestler B. J. Whitmer resides in Alexandria.

Geography
Alexandria is located near the geographic center of Campbell County at  (38.958947, −84.389290).

Transportation
The second oldest road established in Kentucky was the Old State Road, from Newport to Winchester, through Alexandria, Falmouth, Cynthiana, and Paris. This road was established by an act of the Kentucky Legislature in 1836. County residents formed the Newport and Alexandria Turnpike Company to improve the road; the improved turnpike opened in 1856 under the name Alexandria Pike. The road was financed by toll booths, two of which were located in Alexandria. Desiring a free road to the markets in the county, the county government purchased the road in 1921 and made it part of U.S. Route 27.

Because Alexandria does not lie immediately along the Ohio River, its growth has been limited compared to nearby cities that lie along the river.

Climate
Alexandria is located at the extreme northern limit of the humid subtropical climate of the Southeastern United States and at the extreme southern limit of the humid continental climate of the Great Lakes region; Alexandria is situated in a climatic transition zone and is influenced by both of these climates. Rolling hills, valleys, and some urban heat effects from the nearby metropolitan areas of Cincinnati, Covington, and Newport are moderating factors to the overall climate of Alexandria.

Demographics

As of the census of 2000, there were 8,286 people, 2,884 households, and 2,275 families residing in the city. The racial makeup of the city was 98.82% White, 0.02% African American, 0.02% Native American, 0.46% Asian, 0.34% from other races, and 0.34% from two or more races. Hispanic or Latino of any race were 0.76% of the population.

There were 2,884 households, out of which 44.2% had children under the age of 18 living with them, 68.2% were married couples living together, 7.7% had a female householder with no husband present, and 21.1% were non-families. 18.7% of all households were made up of individuals, and 6.8% had someone living alone who was 65 years of age or older. The average household size was 2.87 and the average family size was 3.29.

In the city, the population was spread out, with 30.8% under the age of 18, 7.9% from 18 to 24, 33.2% from 25 to 44, 19.7% from 45 to 64, and 8.4% who were 65 years of age or older. The median age was 33 years. For every 100 females, there were 96.0 males. For every 100 females age 18 and over, there were 94.6 males.

The median income for a household in the city was $83,923 and the median income for a family was $62,392. Males had a median income of $42,002 versus $30,766 for females. The per capita income for the city was $31,819. About 2.5% of families and 4.0% of the population were below the poverty line, including 3.2% of those under age 18 and 8.6% of those age 65 or over.

Education
Residents are within the Campbell County School District. Residents are zoned to Campbell County High School in Claryville Ky

Bishop Brossart High School a private Catholic school, is located in Alexandria but draws from a wider area. Alexandria has a public library, a branch of the Campbell County Public Library.

Events and attractions
The Agricultural Society of Campbell County was organized in 1856. It organized a fair for the benefit of the farmers. This fair has numerous horse show events that are not only popular in Kentucky but around the world. The fair brings high standard horses from around the mideast.

References

External links
City of Alexandria official website
Historical Images and Texts of Alexandria, Kentucky
Historic Campbell County Courthouse, circa 1926

Cities in Campbell County, Kentucky
Cities in Kentucky
County seats in Kentucky
Populated places established in 1793